The following is a list of people from Dayton, Ohio.

Actors, entertainers, and models

Tom Aldredge, actor
Ralph Byrd, actor
Nancy Cartwright, voice artist
Max Charles, actor
Mystro Clark, actor, comedian, and TV host
Willis "Bing" Davis, visual artist and teacher
Dr. Creep aka Barry Hobart, actor
Charles Michael Davis, actor
Mel Epstein, film producer
Dorothy Gish, silent actress
Luke Grimes, actor
Dorian Harewood, actor
Drew Hastings, comedian, actor, writer
Allison Janney, actress 
Ken Jenkins, actor
Toccara Jones, fashion model and TV personality
Gordon Jump, actor
Chad Lowe, actor
Rob Lowe, actor
Aaron O'Connell, actor
Maulik Pancholy, actor, voice actor, author
Dan Patrick (Pugh), sports anchor
Wendy Pepper, reality TV star and fashion designer
Keith Prentice, actor
Ted Ross, actor
Gary Sandy, actor
Sherri Saum, actress
Martin Sheen, actor
Candace Smith, Miss Ohio 2003, reality TV contestant
Beth Stelling, comedian
Andrea Thompson, actress
De'Angelo Wilson, actor
Jonathan Winters, comedian and actor
Vincent M. Ward, actor

Athletes

Will Allen, NFL safety
Michael Bennett, NFL defensive tackle
Pauline Betz, Hall of Fame tennis player, four-time U.S. Open champion
Howie Brown, NFL guard
David Bruton, NFL strong safety, Denver Broncos
Tonja Buford-Bailey, Olympic 400m hurdler
Keith Byars, NFL running back
Roosevelt Chapman, basketball hall of famer and all-time leading scorer at the University of Dayton
Roger Clemens, MLB pitcher
Norris Cole, NBA player, New Orleans Pelicans 
Kurt Coleman, NFL safety, Philadelphia Eagles 
Marco Coleman, NFL defensive tackle
Cris Collinsworth, NFL wide receiver, sports commentator
Daequan Cook, NBA player, playing in the Israeli Basketball Premier League
Greg Cook, NFL quarterback
Charles Daniels, Olympic freestyle swimmer
Megan Duffy, WNBA player, New York Liberty
Rob Dyrdek, skateboarder, Alien Workshop
Claire Falknor, professional soccer player, Houston Dash
Doug France, NFL Player, Los Angeles Rams
Nikki Fuller, professional bodybuilder
Na'Shan Goddard, NFL offensive lineman
Jeff Graham, NFL receiver
Joe Greene, two-time Olympic bronze medalist long jumper
Andy Harmon, NFL player for the Philadelphia Eagles
Ron Harper, basketball player
A. J. Hawk, NFL linebacker, Cincinnati Bengals
Victor Heflin, NFL defensive back
Vince Heflin, NFL wide receiver
John Henderson, NFL wide receiver, Detroit Lions and Minnesota Vikings
Kirk Herbstreit, Ohio State quarterback, football analyst
Chris Hero, pro wrestler
Brady Hoke, Ball State University linebacker
Todd Hollandsworth, baseball player
Darrell Jackson, NFL wide receiver 
Will Johnson, football player
Kerry Kittles, NBA player
Dave Krynzel, MLB player, Baltimore Orioles
Frank Lockhart, race car driver
Ron Lyle, boxer 
Holley Mangold, Olympic weightlifter
Nick Mangold, NFL offensive lineman, New York Jets
Justin Masterson, baseball pitcher
Don May, NBA player
Brandon McKinney, NFL nose tackle, Indiana Colts 
Mike Mickens, NFL defensive back, Cincinnati Bengals
Braxton Miller, NFL wide receiver Houston Texans
Mike Mohler, baseball pitcher
Edwin C. Moses, Olympic gold medalist hurdler
Sean Murphy, MLB Catcher, Oakland A’s
Josh Myers, NFL center, Green Bay Packers
Mike Nugent, NFL kicker, Cincinnati Bengals
Ifeadi Odenigbo, NFL Defensive End, Minnesota Vikings
Jim Paxson Jr., NBA player, Cleveland Cavaliers general manager
John Paxson, basketball player, coach, manager, broadcaster
Peerless Price, NFL wide receiver
Scott Rettich, USF2000 driver
Javon Ringer, NFL running back, Tennessee Titans
Chris Rolfe, soccer player
Brett Salisbury, quarterback
Joe Schilling, kickboxer
Mike Schmidt, Hall of Fame baseball player
Bryan Sellers, race car driver
Donald Smith, NBA player
Joe Thomasson (born 1993), basketball player in the Israel Basketball Premier League
Al Tucker, Jr, NBA basketball player
T. J. Turner, NFL player
Sam Underhill, English Rugby Union player
Salt Walther, Indy car driver
Taylor Ward, baseball player
Dan Wilkinson, NFL defensive tackle
Tamika Williams, WNBA player, Connecticut Sun
Jerel Worthy, NFL defensive end, Green Bay Packers
Chris Wright, NBA forward, Milwaukee Bucks
Steve Yeager, MLB player, Los Angeles Dodgers

Writers and cartoonists

Natalie Clifford Barney, playwright, poet and novelist
Erma Bombeck, columnist and author
Richard H. Brodhead, author and president of Duke University
Si Burick, sports editor and columnist
Milton Caniff, cartoonist
Ritter Collett, sports editor and columnist
Charlotte Reeve Conover, historian
Paul Laurence Dunbar, early African-American poet
Cathy Guisewite, cartoonist
Marj Heyduck, journalist, columnist, editor
Hunter Lewis, author
Hal McCoy, baseball writer
Terry Oroszi, terrorism researcher and author
Clarence Page, journalist and syndicated columnist 
Maulik Pancholy, author 
Mike Peters, opinion cartoonist
Tim Waggoner, horror and fantasy writer
Roz Young, columnist

Entrepreneurs

Larry Augustin, member of the OpenSource community
Larry Connor, founder of The Connor Group
Edward A. Deeds, engineer, inventor, industrialist
Philip Haas, inventor, plumbing specialties manufacturer
George Huffman, founder of Huffy Corporation
Paul Iams, Iams founder
Charles Kettering, inventor of the automobile self-starter
Carl Lindner, Jr., businessman
Nancy Lynn, business owner, pilot, and public speaker
John H. Patterson, founder of National Cash Register
James Ritty, inventor of the cash register
Wright brothers, Orville and Wilbur, inventors of the airplane

Military

Charles G. Bickham, Medal of Honor recipient
Llewellyn Morris Chilson, United States Army career soldier who served during World War II
Richard E. Cole, Air Force pilot who took part in the Doolittle Raid in 1942
Sammy L. Davis, Medal of Honor recipient
Admiral Timothy J. Keating, Commander of the United States Pacific Command
Joseph G. Lapointe Jr, Medal of Honor recipient
Joe C. Paul, Medal of Honor recipient
Sidney Souers, first Director of the CIA
Tony Stein, Medal of Honor recipient

Musicians

Little Axe, blues musician
Leroy Bonner, musician/producer, The Ohio Players
Stevie Brock, pop singer
Kim Deal, rock musician, member of Pixies, The Amps, and The Breeders 
Kelley Deal, rock musician, member of The Amps and The Breeders
Rick Derringer, rock musician
Jim Ferguson, classical/jazz guitarist, composer, author, educator, and music journalist
Tommy James, rock musician and singer of "Mony Mony"
Walter "Junie" Morrison, musician and producer
Vess Ossman, 5-string banjoist
Dottie Peoples, gospel singer
M Ross Perkins, songwriter
Robert Pollard, founder and singer of lo-fi rock band Guided By Voices and other aliases thereof
Harry Reser, banjoist and leader of the Clicquot Club Eskimos
Kim Richey, singer/songwriter
John Scofield, jazz guitarist
John Schmersal, guitarist/singer for Brainiac, who went on to form Enon
Bud Shank, jazz saxophonist
Margo Smith, country music singer, known for her yodeling
Tyler Smith, singer (The Word Alive)
Billy Strayhorn
Roger Troutman and Zapp, musicians/producers
Johnnie Wilder Jr., founder and lead singer, and Keith Wilder, founder, Heatwave, R&B group
Booty Wood, jazz trombonist
Snooky Young, jazz trumpeter

Politicians

James Middleton Cox, Congressman, Ohio governor, 1920 Democratic presidential candidate, founder of Cox Enterprises
Richard Clay Dixon, former mayor of Dayton
Dave Hall, former mayor of Dayton
Tony P. Hall, former US Congressman
Paul Leonard, former mayor of Dayton and lieutenant governor of Ohio
James H. McGee, former mayor of Dayton
C. J. McLin, former Ohio State Representative
Mike Rohrkaste, Wisconsin State Assemblyman and businessman
Mike Turner, US Congressman, former mayor of Dayton

Other

China P. Arnold, convicted murderer serving life without parole for murdering and cooking her daughter, Paris in a microwave
Jordan Anderson, former slave and author of "Letter from a Freedman to His Old Master"
Charles Bassett, astronaut
Phil Donahue, talk-show host, began his eponymous show in Dayton, where he spent over a decade
Ronnie and Donnie Galyon (1951–2020), oldest set of conjoined twins in the world
Steve Gibson, computer programmer
George J. Graham, Jr., political theorist
Ahad Israfil, gunshot victim
Virginia Kettering (1907–2003), philanthropist
William H. Lough (1881–1940s), economist
W. S. McIntosh, civil rights activist
Jessica Moore, journalist
Robert R. Nathan, economist
Mike Nawrocki, co-creator of VeggieTales
Melvin Lorrel Nichols, emeritus professor of chemistry, Cornell University
Alice E. Heckler Peters (1845-1921), social reformer
Jane Reece, photographer
Amy Schneider, Jeopardy! champion, and the first openly transgender contestant to qualify for the Tournament of Champions
Constantine Scollen (1841-1902), renowned Irish missionary and "Whoop-Up Trail" priest among the native peoples of Canada and US. 
Howard Dwight Smith, architect of Ohio Stadium
Dorothy Stang (1931–2005), Catholic nun of the Sisters of Notre Dame de Namur and Amazonian activist
Norman Steenrod, mathematician
Strobe Talbott, writer and diplomat

References

 
Dayton, Ohio
People
Dayton, Ohio